Leonor Elizabeth Ceballos Watling (born 28 July 1975) is a Spanish film actress and singer.

Early life
Leonor Ceballos Watling was born on 28 July 1975 in Madrid, to a Spanish father from Cádiz and an English mother, the youngest of four siblings (two brothers and two sisters). Her first vocation was that of dancer, but a knee injury made this impossible.

Career

Watling began her acting career in theatre. She earned her feature film debut with a performance in Pablo Llorca's Jardines colgantes (1993). After that she participated in several TV series, such as Hermanos de leche, Farmacia de guardia or Querido maestro, but her most successful role was in the series Raquel busca su sitio with Cayetana Guillén Cuervo. In 1998, she was nominated for a Goya award for her role in La hora de los valientes, and was named as one of European films 'Shooting Stars' by European Film Promotion in 1999. In 2002, she was nominated again for a Goya for her role in My Mother Likes Women.

Watling dubbed Anne Hathaway as the voice of "Red Pucket" (Little Red Riding Hood) in Hoodwinked (2005). She also took part in The Oxford Murders, alongside Elijah Wood and John Hurt.

In 2006, Watling starred in Paris, Je T'aime segment "Bastille" as Marie Christine. The film was directed by many famous directors who each had to produce a five-minute film set in Paris, the city of love. Spanish writer-director Isabel Coixet wrote and directed the segment "Bastille" and Watling starred alongside Sergio Castellitto and Miranda Richardson as Sergio's younger lover with whom he plans to run away after ending his relationship with his wife Miranda.

She combines film performances with her work with the band Marlango, in which she is vocalist and sings mostly in English.

She appeared in TV series Pulsaciones.

Personal life

Watling is in a relationship with Oscar-winning Uruguayan musician Jorge Drexler, with whom she has a son, Luca, born in January 2009, and a daughter, Lea, born in July 2011.

Filmography
Film

Television

Other 
 "Somos Anormales", music video by Residente (2017)

Discography

With Marlango
 Marlango (2004)
 Automatic Imperfection (2005)
 The Electrical Morning (2007)
 Life in the Treehouse (2010)
 Un Día Extraordinario (2012)
 El Porvenir (2014)
 Technicolor (2018)

Collaborations
 Miguel Bosé – Duet in "Este mundo va" from the album Papito
 Jorge Drexler – Backing vocals in "El otro engranaje" from the album 12 segundos de oscuridad
 Diego Vasallo – Backing vocals in "La vida mata" from the album Los abismos cotidianos
 Fito Páez – Duet in "Pétalo de sal" and "Creo" from the album No sé si es Baires o Madrid
 Jorge Drexler – Duet in "Toque de queda" from the album Amar la trama

Accolades

References

External links

Official Marlango website

1975 births
English-language singers from Spain
Living people
Spanish people of English descent
Spanish film actresses
Singers from Madrid
Actresses from Madrid
Spanish television actresses
Spanish stage actresses
Spanish child actresses
21st-century Spanish singers
21st-century Spanish women singers